Boy Meets Girl ( Ben Loke'ah Bat) is a 1982 Israeli drama directed by Michal Bat-Adam. It was filmed on location at Kibbutz Ma'ayan Tzvi.

The story is a semi-autobiographical account of Bat-Adams' own upbringing at a kibbutz boarding school. Her 1994 film, Aya: Imagined Autobiography, revisits the character of Aya, who is now a married woman haunted by her past.

Plot
Aya (Einat Helfman) is a shy 10-year-old girl who has grown up in Tel Aviv.  When her parents, who are both doctors, travel to Thailand as part of their work, Aya is placed in a boarding school on a kibbutz.  As an outsider, she has difficulty adjusting to the insularity and unfamiliar values and practices of kibbutz society.  She struggles to cope with the challenges of living with dozens of her peers in a communal children's dormitory where there is no separation according to gender.

Cast
Einat Helfman as Aya
 as Ina
 as Aya's father
Shai Golan as Zvika
Gill Dontchevzky as Neni
Ayala Fiszel as Hanna's Mother
Erella Ashkenazi as Teacher
Andrea Sade as English Teacher
Dina Limon as Teacher
Assaf Zur as Giora
Osnat Farago as Hanna
Eyal Fox as Dodo
Boaz Rekiewicz as Roni
Amalya Dayan as Amalya

References

External links
 

1982 films
1980s Hebrew-language films
Films about the kibbutz
1982 drama films
Films directed by Michal Bat-Adam
Israeli drama films